Peasants Front of Indonesia was a peasant mass organisation connected to the Communist Party of Indonesia (PKI). BTI was founded 25 November 1945. The previous peasant organisation of PKI had been the Peasants Union (Serikat Tani) formed in 1945. Its final general chairman was Asmu, the PKI's main agricultural analyst, who was appointed to the position in July 1962. The organization struggled for land reform, and was suppressed along with PKI in 1965.

References

Mass organizations of the Communist Party of Indonesia
1966 disestablishments in Indonesia
1945 establishments in Indonesia